Mugunghwa may refer to:
Hibiscus syriacus, the national flower of South Korea
Mugunghwa-ho, a class of train